The Great Taking of the Veil is an oil on canvas painting executed in 1897–98 by the Russian Symbolist painter Mikhail Nesterov. It is now in the collection of the Russian Museum in Saint Petersburg.

The canvas depicts a solemn procession of nuns accompanying a novice to the taking of the veil in the Volga countryside, after which she would renounce her worldly life for a life of religious devotion in a nunnery.

In the artist's words: "The theme is sad, but the reviving nature, the Russian north, quiet and delicate ... makes the picture touching, at least for those who have a tender feeling". It ensured Nesterov's election in 1898 to the Russian Imperial Academy of Arts.

See also
 100 Great Paintings, 1980 BBC series

References

1898 paintings
Paintings by Mikhail Nesterov
Collections of the Russian Museum